The Lewis House is a historic house at 276 Woburn Street in Reading, Massachusetts.  The -story wood-frame house was built in the late 1870s by John Lewis, a successful shoe dealer.  The house is three bays wide, with a hipped roof with a single gable dormer.  The roof has extended eaves with false rafter ends that are actually lengthened modillion blocks; these features give the house a Colonial Revival feel.  The corner boards are pilastered, and the front entry is flanked by half-length sidelight windows and topped by a pedimented lintel, above which is a round fanlight window.

The house was listed on the National Register of Historic Places in 1984.

See also
National Register of Historic Places listings in Reading, Massachusetts
National Register of Historic Places listings in Middlesex County, Massachusetts

References

Houses on the National Register of Historic Places in Reading, Massachusetts
Colonial Revival architecture in Massachusetts
Houses completed in 1875
Houses in Reading, Massachusetts